Daphne Gottlieb is a San Francisco-based performance poet.

She is the winner of the Acker Award for Excellence in the Avant-Garde, the Audre Lorde Award for Poetry, the Firecracker Alternative Book Award, and a five-time finalist for the Lambda Literary Award. Critics have praised her work as "fierce," "unapologetic," "scorching" and "deliriously gutsy." She is the author of 10 books in print: 5 books of poetry, 1 nonfiction book, 1 graphic novel, 1 book of short stories, and 2 anthologies. She has been widely published in journals including Utne Reader, Tikkun, nerve.com, mcsweeney’s.net, Exquisite Corpse and Instant City. Her work has appeared in a number of anthologies including Don't Forget to Write! (826 Valencia Books, 2005), Red Light: Saints, Sinners and Sluts (Arsenal Pulp Press, 2005), With a Rough Tongue: Femmes Write Porn (Arsenal Pulp, 2005) and Short Fuse: A Contemporary Anthology of Global Performance Poetry (Ratapallax, 2003). She is also the cover girl on San Francisco Noir (Akashic Books, 2005).

Besides anchoring three national performance poetry tours, featuring with Maggie Estep, Hal Sirowitz and Lydia Lunch, Gottlieb has also appeared across the country with the Slam America bus tour and with notorious all-girl wordsters Sister Spit. She has performed at festivals coast-to-coast, including South by Southwest, Bumbershoot, and Ladyfest Bay Area.

Until 2006, she served as the poetry editor of the online LGBT literary magazine Lodestar Quarterly. She was a co-organizer of ForWord Girls, the first spoken word festival for anyone who is, has been or will be a girl, which was held in September 2002.

Gottlieb has taught at Mills College, California Institute of Integral Studies, New College of California, and has also performed and taught creative writing workshops around the country, from high schools and colleges to community centers. She received her MFA from Mills College.

Books

Author
Pretty Much Dead (Ladybox Books, 2015)
15 Ways to Stay Alive (Manic D Press, 2012)
Kissing Dead Girls (Soft Skull Press, 2008) 
Final Girl (Soft Skull Press, 2003)
Why Things Burn (Soft Skull Press, 2001)
Pelt (Odd Girls Press, 1999)

Editor
Dear Dawn: Aileen Wuornos in her Own Words (Soft Skull Press, 2012)
Homewrecker: An Adultery Reader (Soft Skull Press, 2005) 
Fucking Daphne: Mostly True Stories and Fictions (Seal Press, 2008)

Awards and nominations

 Final Girl was the winner of the Audre Lorde Award in Poetry for 2003 from The Publishing Triangle.
 Final Girl was named one of The Village Voices Favorite Books of 2003, and received rave reviews from Publishers Weekly, the San Francisco Chronicle and The Village Voice.
 Final Girl was nominated for a Bram Stoker Award by the Horror Writer's Association.
 Why Things Burn was the winner of a 2001 Firecracker Alternative Book Award (Special Recognition — Spoken Word) for 2001.
 Why Things Burn was a finalist for the Lambda Literary Award for 2001.
 Fucking Daphne: Mostly True Stories and Fictions was a nominee for the 2008 Lambda Literary Award
 Kissing Dead Girls was a nominee for the 2008 Lambda Literary Award

Bibliography
 Pelt. Odd Girls Press, 1999.
 Why Things Burn. Soft Skull Press, 2001.
 Final Girl. Soft Skull Press, 2003.
 Homewrecker: An Adultery Anthology. Soft Skull Press, 2005. (editor)
 Jokes and the Unconscious: A Graphic Novel. Cleis Press, 2006. (Gottlieb, author; DiMassa, Illustrator)
 Kissing Dead Girls. Soft Skull Press, 2008.
 Fucking Daphne: Mostly True Stories and Fictions. Seal Press, 2008. (editor)
 15 Ways to Stay Alive. Manic D Press, 2011

See also

 Poetry slam
 Punk literature

References

External links
 Daphne Gottlieb Official Site
 2001 Lambda Literary Award Nominees
 2003 Bram Stoker Award Nominees 
 Interview with Daphne Gottlieb at Hot Metal Bridge
 Interview with Daphne Gottlieb at Bloggasm
 Interview with Daphne Gottlieb at LiP Magazine
 Interview with Daphne Gottlieb at Gay People's Chronicle
 Interview with Daphne Gottlieb at Small Spiral Notebook
 Two poems by Daphne Gottlieb at the Homestead Review
 Poem: "Whitman's Sampler" at McSweeney's
 Poem: "Dirty" at Nerve
 Poem: "No Poems After Auschwitz" at Poetz.com
 Poem: "Nocturnal Missions" at Big Bridge
 Review of Final Girl at Bookslut
 Review of Homewrecker at Detroit Metro Times

Living people
1968 births
New College of California
Writers from San Francisco
Mills College alumni
Punk poets
American women poets
American LGBT poets
21st-century American poets
21st-century American women writers
21st-century LGBT people
Women in punk